Levi Davis may refer to:
 Levi Davis (politician)
 Levi Davis (rugby union)